Heat shock 70 kDa protein 6 is a protein that in humans is encoded by the HSPA6 gene.

References

Further reading

External links 
 

Heat shock proteins